Dean Blechman is an American businessman, movie producer, entrepreneur, and currently the host of The Dean Blechman Show.

Career 
In 1979, after graduating Monmouth University, Blechman became a salesperson for TWINLAB, a manufacturer of nutritional supplements and wellness products. He is TWINLAB's Executive Vice President of Sales. Blechman also helped found a multi-level marketing company called The Trump Network.

In the early 1990s Blechman served as a Director and Board Member of the National Nutritional Foods Association (NNFA). He was a strategist and lobbyist for the NNFA, contributing to the passage in 1994 of the Dietary Supplement Health and Education Act.

In 1998 he was honored by Ernst & Young Entrepreneur of the Year Award.

Blechman is currently the host of his own online radio talk show, which deals with topics including sports, lifestyle, politics, entertainment, and business.

Blechman is an executive producer on the film Greystone Park, a 2012 horror film written and directed by Sean Stone.

References 

Year of birth missing (living people)
Living people
People from Brooklyn
Monmouth University alumni
Businesspeople from New York City